The Archdeaconry of Lothian, located in modern-day Scotland, was a sub-division of the diocese of St Andrews, one of two archdeaconries within the diocese and in essence that part of the diocese which lay south of the Forth. The Lothian archdeaconry was headed by the Archdeacon of Lothian, a subordinate of the Bishop of St Andrews.

Organisation
In the medieval period, the Archdeaconry of Lothian contained three deaneries: Linlithgow, Haddington and Merse.

Deanery of Linlithgow

Deanery of Lothian or Haddington

Deanery of the Merse

References

 McNeill, Peter G.B. & MacQueen, Hector L. (eds), Atlas of Scottish History to 1707, (Edinburgh, 1996)
 Watt, D.E.R., Fasti Ecclesiae Scoticanae Medii Aevi ad annum 1638, 2nd Draft, (St Andrews, 1969), pp. 309–14

Lothian
Lothian